Brian Fitzpatrick may refer to:

Brian Fitzpatrick (Australian author) (1905–1965), Australian author, historian, journalist
Brian Fitzpatrick (basketball) (born 1989), American-Irish basketball player
Brian Fitzpatrick (Canadian politician) (born 1945), member of Parliament from Saskatchewan
Brian Fitzpatrick (rugby union) (1931–2006), New Zealand rugby union player
Brian Fitzpatrick (Scottish politician) (born 1961), Scottish lawyer and politician
Brian Fitzpatrick (American politician) (born 1973), U.S. Representative from Pennsylvania
Brian T. Fitzpatrick (born 1975), American academic and lawyer
Brian Mac Giolla Phádraig (poet) (c. 1580 – 1653), Irish name anglicised to Brian Fitzpatrick

See also 
Ryan Fitzpatrick (born 1982), American football player
Fitzpatrick (surname)
Fitzpatrick (disambiguation)